Charles Grant, also  credited as Charles Flohe or Charles Floye, is an American actor, who portrayed Connor McCabe on NBC's soap opera Santa Barbara from 1992 to 1993. His other soap roles include playing John 'Preacher' Emerson from 1982 to 1984 on The Edge of Night, the first Evan Frame on Another World from 1988 to 1990. He also played Grant Chambers on The Bold and the Beautiful from 1996 to 1998.

Grant began as model with agency Zoe, then appeared in TV commercials and studied acting under Warren Robertson.

He was married to actress Kim Delaney on July 22, 1984. The couple later divorced.

Filmography
 1982–1984 The Edge of Night as Preacher Emerson
 1984 Oxford Blues as Student Photographer
 1985 Rappin' as Duane 
 1986 The Delta Force as Tom Hale, US Navy Diver
 1986 P.O.W. the Escape as Sparks
 1988 Brothers in Arms as Dallas
 1992 Loving Lulu as Sam
 1992 In the Heat of the Night as David Ritt
 1994 Lady in Waiting as Scott Henley
 1995 Silk Stalkings as Rick
 1995 Kung Fu: The Legend Continues as Rhiner
 1995 Renegade as Brock
 1996 Playback as David Burgess
 1996 Co-ed Call Girl as Andrew Carlson
 1997 Early Edition as Joe Damski
 1996–1998 ''The Bold and the Beautiful as Grant Chambers

References

External links

1957 births
American male soap opera actors
American male television actors
Living people
Actors from Winston-Salem, North Carolina
Male actors from North Carolina